Events from the year 1509 in Ireland.

Incumbent
Lord: Henry VII (until 21 April), then Henry VIII

Events

Births

Deaths
 Ulick Fionn Burke, 6th Lord of Clanricarde
 Clement Fitzleones, an Irish lawyer and judge

References

 
Ireland
Years of the 16th century in Ireland